Twins are two offspring produced by the same pregnancy. Twins can be either monozygotic ('identical', ie. 'natural cloning'), meaning that they develop from one zygote, which splits and forms two embryos, or dizygotic ('non-identical' or 'fraternal'), meaning that each twin develops from a separate egg and each egg is fertilized by its own sperm cell. Since identical twins develop from one zygote, they will share the same sex, while fraternal twins may or may not.  In rare cases twins can have the same mother and different fathers (heteropaternal superfecundation).

In contrast, a fetus that develops alone in the womb (the much more common case, in humans) is called a singleton, and the general term for one offspring of a multiple birth is a multiple. Unrelated look-alikes whose resemblance parallels that of twins are referred to as doppelgängers.

Statistics

The human twin birth rate in the United States rose 76% from 1980 through 2009, from 9.4 to 16.7 twin sets (18.8 to 33.3 twins) per 1,000 births. The Yoruba people have the highest rate of twinning in the world, at 45–50 twin sets (90–100 twins) per 1,000 live births, possibly because of high consumption of a specific type of yam containing a natural phytoestrogen which may stimulate the ovaries to release an egg from each side. In Central Africa, there are 18–30 twin sets (or 36–60 twins) per 1,000 live births. In South America, South Asia (India, Pakistan, Bangladesh, Nepal), and Southeast Asia, the lowest rates are found; only 6 to 9 twin sets per 1,000 live births. North America and Europe have intermediate rates of 9 to 16 twin sets per 1,000 live births.

Multiple pregnancies are much less likely to carry to full term than single births, with twin pregnancies lasting on average 37 weeks, three weeks less than full term. Women who have a family history of fraternal twins have a higher chance of producing fraternal twins themselves, as there is a genetically linked tendency to hyper-ovulate. There is no known genetic link for identical twinning. Other factors that increase the odds of having fraternal twins include maternal age, fertility drugs and other fertility treatments, nutrition, and prior births. Some women intentionally turn to fertility drugs in order to conceive twins.

Types and zygosity
The vast majority of twins are either dizygotic (fraternal) or monozygotic (identical). Less common variants are discussed further down the article.

Fraternal twins can be any of the following:
 Female–female twins: Sometimes called sororal twins (25%).
 Male–male twins: Sometimes called fraternal twins (25%).
 Female-male twins: This is the most common pairing (50%), simply by virtue of it encompassing both "female-male" (25%) and "male-female" (25%) twins.

Among non-twin births, male singletons are slightly (about five percent) more common than female singletons. The rates for singletons vary slightly by country. For example, the sex ratio of birth in the US is 1.05 males/female, while it is 1.07 males/female in Italy. However, males are also more susceptible than females to die in utero, and since the death rate in utero is higher for twins, it leads to female twins being more common than male twins.

Zygosity is the degree of identity in the genome of twins.

Dizygotic (fraternal) twins

Dizygotic (DZ) or fraternal twins (also referred to as "non-identical twins", "dissimilar twins", "biovular twins", and, informally in the case of females, "sororal twins") usually occur when two fertilized eggs are implanted in the uterus wall at the same time. When two eggs are independently fertilized by two different sperm cells, fraternal twins result. The two eggs, or ova, form two zygotes, hence the terms dizygotic and biovular. Fraternal twins are, essentially, two ordinary siblings who happen to develop in the womb together and who are born at the same time, since they arise from two separate eggs fertilized by two separate sperm, just like ordinary siblings. This is the most common type of twin.

Dizygotic twins, like any other siblings, will practically always have different sequences on each chromosome, due to chromosomal crossover during meiosis. Dizygotic twins share only 50 percent of each other's genes, which resemble amongst siblings that are conceived and born at different times. Like any other siblings, dizygotic twins may look similar, particularly as they are the same age. However, dizygotic twins may also look very different from each other (for example, be of opposite sexes).

Studies show that there is a genetic proclivity for dizygotic twinning. However, it is only the mother who has any effect on the chances of having such twins; there is no known mechanism for a father to cause the release of more than one ovum. Dizygotic twinning ranges from six per thousand births in Japan (similar to the rate of monozygotic twins) to 14 and more per thousand in some African countries.

Dizygotic twins are also more common for older mothers, with twinning rates doubling in mothers over the age of 35. With the advent of technologies and techniques to assist women in getting pregnant, the rate of fraternals has increased markedly.

Monozygotic (identical) twins
Monozygotic (MZ) or identical twins occur when a single egg is fertilized to form one zygote (hence, "monozygotic") which then divides into two separate embryos. The chances of having identical twins is relatively rare — around 3 or 4 in every 1,000 births.

Mechanism 
Regarding spontaneous or natural monozygotic twinning, a recent theory proposes that monozygotic twins are probably formed when a blastocyst contains two inner cell masses (ICM), each of which will lead to a separate fetus, rather than by the embryo splitting while hatching from the zona pellucida (the gelatinous protective coating around the blastocyst).

Monozygotic twins may also be created artificially by embryo splitting. It can be used as an expansion of in vitro fertilization (IVF) to increase the number of available embryos for embryo transfer.

Incidence
Monozygotic twinning occurs in birthing at a rate of about 3 in every 1000 deliveries worldwide (about 0.3% of the world population).

The likelihood of a single fertilization resulting in monozygotic twins is uniformly distributed in all populations around the world. This is in marked contrast to dizygotic twinning, which ranges from about six per thousand births in Japan (almost similar to the rate of identical twins, which is around 4–5) to 15 and more per thousand in some parts of India and up to over 20 in some Central African countries. The exact cause for the splitting of a zygote or embryo is unknown.

IVF techniques are more likely to create dizygotic twins. For IVF deliveries, there are nearly 21 pairs of twins for every 1,000.

Genetic and epigenetic similarity

Monozygotic twins are genetically nearly identical and they are the same chromosomal sex unless there has been a mutation during development. The children of monozygotic twins test genetically as half-siblings (or full siblings, if a pair of monozygotic twins reproduces with another pair or with the same person), rather than first cousins. Identical twins do not have the same fingerprints however, because even within the confines of the womb, the fetuses touch different parts of their environment, giving rise to small variations in their corresponding prints and thus making them unique.

Monozygotic twins always have the same genotype. Normally due to an environmental factor or the deactivation of different X chromosomes in female monozygotic twins, and in some extremely rare cases, due to aneuploidy, twins may express different sexual phenotypes, normally from an XXY Klinefelter syndrome zygote splitting unevenly.

Monozygotic twins, although genetically very similar, are not genetically exactly the same. The DNA in white blood cells of 66 pairs of monozygotic twins was analyzed for 506,786 single-nucleotide polymorphisms known to occur in human populations. Polymorphisms appeared in 2 of the 33 million comparisons, leading the researchers to extrapolate that the blood cells of monozygotic twins may have on the order of one DNA-sequence difference for every 12 million nucleotides, which would imply hundreds of differences across the entire genome. The mutations producing the differences detected in this study would have occurred during embryonic cell-division (after the point of fertilization). If they occur early in fetal development, they will be present in a very large proportion of body cells.

Another cause of difference between monozygotic twins is epigenetic modification, caused by differing environmental influences throughout their lives. Epigenetics refers to the level of activity of any particular gene. A gene may become switched on, switched off, or could become partially switched on or off in an individual. This epigenetic modification is triggered by environmental events. Monozygotic twins can have markedly different epigenetic profiles. A study of 80 pairs of monozygotic twins ranging in age from three to 74 showed that the youngest twins have relatively few epigenetic differences. The number of epigenetic differences increases with age. Fifty-year-old twins had over three times the epigenetic difference of three-year-old twins. Twins who had spent their lives apart (such as those adopted by two different sets of parents at birth) had the greatest difference. However, certain characteristics become more alike as twins age, such as IQ and personality.

In January 2021, new research from a team of researchers in Iceland was published in the journal Nature Genetics suggesting that identical twins may not be quite as identical as previously thought.  The four-year study of monozygotic (identical) twins and their extended families revealed that these twins have genetic differences that begin in the early stages of embryonic development.

Polar body and semi-identical twins
A 1981 study of a deceased triploid XXX twin fetus without a heart showed that although its fetal development suggested that it was an identical twin, as it shared a placenta with its healthy twin, tests revealed that it was probably a polar body twin. The authors were unable to predict whether a healthy fetus could result from a polar body twinning. However, a study in 2012 found that it is possible for a polar body to result in a healthy fetus.

In 2003, a study argued that many cases of triploidy arise from sesquizygotic (semi-identical) twinning.

Degree of separation

The degree of separation of the twins in utero depends on if and when they split into two zygotes.  Dizygotic twins were always two zygotes.  Monozygotic twins split into two zygotes at some time very early in the pregnancy.  The timing of this separation determines the chorionicity (the number of placentae) and amniocity (the number of sacs) of the pregnancy.  Dichorionic twins either never divided (i.e.: were dizygotic) or they divided within the first 4 days. Monoamnionic twins divide after the first week.

In very rare cases, twins become conjoined twins. Non-conjoined monozygotic twins form up to day 14 of embryonic development, but when twinning occurs after 14 days, the twins will likely be conjoined. Furthermore, there can be various degrees of shared environment of twins in the womb, potentially leading to pregnancy complications.

It is a common misconception that two placentas automatically implies dizygotic twins, but if monozygotic twins separate early enough, the arrangement of sacs and placentas in utero is in fact indistinguishable from that of dizygotic twins.

Demographics
A 2006 study has found that insulin-like growth factor present in dairy products may increase the chance of dizygotic twinning. Specifically, the study found that vegan mothers (who exclude dairy from their diets) are one-fifth as likely to have twins as vegetarian or omnivore mothers, and concluded that "Genotypes favoring elevated IGF and diets including dairy products, especially in areas where growth hormone is given to cattle, appear to enhance the chances of multiple pregnancies due to ovarian stimulation."

From 1980 to 1997, the number of twin births in the United States rose 52%. This rise can at least partly be attributed to the increasing popularity of fertility drugs and procedures such as IVF, which result in multiple births more frequently than unassisted fertilizations do. It may also be linked to the increase of growth hormones in food.

Ethnicity

About 1 in 90 human births (1.1%) results from a twin pregnancy. The rate of dizygotic twinning varies greatly among ethnic groups, ranging as high as about 45 per 1000 births (4.5%) for the Yoruba to 10% for Linha São Pedro, a tiny Brazilian settlement which belongs to the city of Cândido Godói. In Cândido Godói, one in five pregnancies has resulted in twins. The Argentine historian Jorge Camarasa has put forward the theory that experiments of the Nazi doctor Josef Mengele could be responsible for the high ratio of twins in the area. His theory was rejected by Brazilian scientists who had studied twins living in Linha São Pedro; they suggested genetic factors within that community as a more likely explanation. A high twinning rate has also been observed in other places of the world, including:
Igbo-Ora in Nigeria
Kodinhi, located in Kerala, India
Mohammadpur Umri, located in Uttar Pradesh, India

The widespread use of fertility drugs causing hyperovulation (stimulated release of multiple eggs by the mother) has caused what some call an "epidemic of multiple births". In 2001, for the first time ever in the US, the twinning rate exceeded 3% of all births. Nevertheless, the rate of monozygotic twins remains at about 1 in 333 across the globe.

In a study on the maternity records of 5750 Hausa women living in the Savannah zone of Nigeria, there were 40 twins and 2 triplets per 1000 births. Twenty-six percent of twins were monozygotic. The incidence of multiple births, which was about five times higher than that observed in any western population, was significantly lower than that of other ethnic groups, who live in the hot and humid climate of the southern part of the country. The incidence of multiple births was related to maternal age but did not bear any association to the climate or prevalence of malaria.

Twins are more common in people of African descent.

Predisposing factors
The predisposing factors of monozygotic twinning are unknown.

Dizygotic twin pregnancies are slightly more likely when the following factors are present in the woman:
She is of West African descent (especially Yoruba)
She is between the age of 30 and 40 years
She is greater than average height and weight
She has had several previous pregnancies.

Women undergoing certain fertility treatments may have a greater chance of dizygotic multiple births. In the United States it has been estimated that by 2011 36% of twin births resulted from conception by assisted reproductive technology.

The risk of twin birth can vary depending on what types of fertility treatments are used. With in vitro fertilisation (IVF), this is primarily due to the insertion of multiple embryos into the uterus. Ovarian hyperstimulation without IVF has a very high risk of multiple birth. Reversal of anovulation with clomifene (trade names including Clomid) has a relatively less but yet significant risk of multiple pregnancy.

Delivery interval
A 15-year German study of 8,220 vaginally delivered twins (that is, 4,110 pregnancies) in Hesse yielded a mean delivery time interval of 13.5 minutes. The delivery interval between the twins was measured as follows:

Within 15 minutes: 75.8%
16–30 minutes: 16.4%
31–45 minutes: 4.3%
46–60 minutes: 1.7%
Over 60 minutes: 1.8%

The study stated that the occurrence of complications "was found to be more likely with increasing twin-to-twin delivery time interval" and suggested that the interval be kept short, though it noted that the study did not examine causes of complications and did not control for factors such as the level of experience of the obstetrician, the wish of the women giving birth, or the "management strategies" of the procedure of delivering the second twin.

There have also been cases in which twins are born a number of days apart. Possibly the worldwide record for the duration of the time gap between the first and the second delivery was the birth of twins 97 days apart in Cologne, Germany, the first of which was born on November 17, 2018.

Complications during pregnancy

Vanishing twins

Researchers suspect that as many as 1 in 8 pregnancies start out as multiples, but only a single fetus is brought to full term, because the other fetus has died very early in the pregnancy and has not been detected or recorded. Early obstetric ultrasonography exams sometimes reveal an "extra" fetus, which fails to develop and instead disintegrates and vanishes in the uterus. There are several reasons for the "vanishing" fetus, including it being embodied or absorbed by the other fetus, placenta or the mother. This is known as vanishing twin syndrome. Also, in an unknown proportion of cases, two zygotes may fuse soon after fertilization, resulting in a single chimeric embryo, and, later, fetus.

Conjoined twins

Conjoined twins (or the once-commonly used term "siamese") are monozygotic twins whose bodies are joined during pregnancy. This occurs when the zygote starts to split after day 12 following fertilization and fails to separate completely. This condition occurs in about 1 in 50,000 human pregnancies.
Most conjoined twins are now evaluated for surgery to attempt to separate them into separate functional bodies. The degree of difficulty rises if a vital organ or structure is shared between twins, such as the brain, heart, liver or lungs.

Chimerism

A chimera is an ordinary person or animal except that some of their parts actually came from their twin or from the mother. A chimera may arise either from monozygotic twin fetuses (where it would be impossible to detect), or from dizygotic fetuses, which can be identified by chromosomal comparisons from various parts of the body. The number of cells derived from each fetus can vary from one part of the body to another, and often leads to characteristic mosaicism skin coloration in human chimeras. A chimera may be intersex, composed of cells from a male twin and a female twin. In one case DNA tests determined that a woman, Lydia Fairchild, mystifyingly, was not the mother of two of her three children; she was found to be a chimera, and the two children were conceived from eggs derived from cells of their mother's twin.

Parasitic twins

Sometimes one twin fetus will fail to develop completely and continue to cause problems for its surviving twin. One fetus acts as a parasite towards the other.
Sometimes the parasitic twin becomes an almost indistinguishable part of the other, and sometimes this needs to be treated medically.

Partial molar twins
A very rare type of parasitic twinning is one where a single viable twin is endangered when the other zygote becomes cancerous, or "molar". This means that the molar zygote's cellular division continues unchecked, resulting in a cancerous growth that overtakes the viable fetus. Typically, this results when one twin has either triploidy or complete paternal uniparental disomy, resulting in little or no fetus and a cancerous, overgrown placenta, resembling a bunch of grapes.

Miscarried twin
Occasionally, a woman will suffer a miscarriage early in pregnancy, yet the pregnancy will continue; one twin was miscarried but the other was able to be carried to term. This occurrence is similar to the vanishing twin syndrome, but typically occurs later, as the twin is not reabsorbed.

Low birth weight
It is very common for twins to be born at a low birth weight. This is largely due to the fact that twins are typically born premature. Premature birth and low birth weights, especially when under , can increase the risk of several health-related issues, such as vision and hearing loss, mental disabilities, and cerebral palsy. There is an increased possibility of potential complications as the birth weight of the baby decreases.

Twin-to-twin transfusion syndrome

Monozygotic twins who share a placenta can develop twin-to-twin transfusion syndrome. This condition means that blood from one twin is being diverted into the other twin. One twin, the 'donor' twin, is small and anemic, the other, the 'recipient' twin, is large and polycythemic. The lives of both twins are endangered by this condition.

Stillbirths 
Stillbirths occurs when a fetus dies after 20 weeks of gestation. There are two types of stillbirth, including intrauterine death and intrapartum death. Intrauterine death occurs when a baby dies during late pregnancy. Intrapartum death, which is more common, occurs when a baby dies while the mother is giving birth. The cause of stillbirth is often unknown, but the rate of babies who are stillborn is higher in twins and multiple births. Caesareans or inductions are advised after 38 weeks of pregnancy for twins, because the risk of stillbirth increases after this time.

Heterotopic pregnancy 
Heterotopic pregnancy is an exceedingly rare type of dizygotic twinning in which one twin implants in the uterus as normal and the other remains in the fallopian tube as an ectopic pregnancy. Ectopic pregnancies must be resolved because they can be life-threatening to the mother. However, in most cases, the intrauterine pregnancy can be salvaged.

Management of birth
For otherwise healthy twin pregnancies where both twins are head down a trial of vaginal delivery is recommended at between 37 and 38 weeks. Vaginal delivery in this case does not worsen the outcome for the infant as compared with Caesarean section.  There is controversy on the best method of delivery where the first twin is head first and the second is not. When the first twin is not head down a caesarean section is often recommended.  It is estimated that 75% of twin pregnancies in the United States were delivered by caesarean section in 2008. In comparison, the rate of caesarean section for all pregnancies in the general population varies between 14% and 40%. In twins that share the same placenta, delivery may be considered at 36 weeks. For twins who are born early, there is insufficient evidence for or against placing preterm stable twins in the same cot or incubator (co-bedding).

Human twin studies

Twin studies are utilized in an attempt to determine how much of a particular trait is attributable to either genetics or environmental influence. These studies compare monozygotic and dizygotic twins for medical, genetic, or psychological characteristics to try to isolate genetic influence from epigenetic and environmental influence. Twins that have been separated early in life and raised in separate households are especially sought-after for these studies, which have been used widely in the exploration of human nature.  Classical twin studies are now being supplemented with molecular genetic studies which identify individual genes.

Unusual twinnings

Bi-paternal twins
This phenomenon is known as heteropaternal superfecundation. One 1992 study estimates that the frequency of heteropaternal superfecundation among dizygotic twins, whose parents were involved in paternity suits, was approximately 2.4%.

Mixed twins

Dizygotic twins from biracial couples can sometimes be mixed twins, which exhibit differing ethnic and racial features. One such pairing was born in London in 1993 to a white mother and Caribbean father.

Monozygotic twins of different sexes
Among monozygotic twins, in extremely rare cases, twins have been born with different sexes (one male, one female). When monozygotic twins are born with different sexes it is because of chromosomal defects.  The probability of this is so small that multiples having different sexes is universally accepted as a sound basis for in utero clinical determination that the multiples are not monozygotic.

Another abnormality that can result in monozygotic twins of different sexes is if the egg is fertilized by a male sperm but during cell division only the X chromosome is duplicated. This results in one normal male (XY) and one female with Turner syndrome (45,X).  In these cases, although the twins did form from the same fertilized egg, it is incorrect to refer to them as genetically identical, since they have different karyotypes.

Semi-identical (sesquizygotic) twins
Monozygotic twins can develop differently, due to their genes being differently activated. More unusual are "semi-identical twins", also known as "sesquizygotic". , only two cases have been reported. These "half-identical twins" are hypothesized to occur when an unfertilized egg cleaves into two identical attached ova, both of which are viable for fertilization. Both ova are then fertilized, each by a different sperm, and the coalesced zygotes undergo further cell duplications developing as a chimeric blastomere. If this blastomere then undergoes a twinning event, two embryos will be formed, with different paternal genetic information and identical maternal genetic information.

This results in a set of twins with identical gene sequence from the mother's side, but different sequences from the father's side. Cells in each fetus carry chromosomes from either sperm, resulting in chimeras. This form had been speculated until only recently being recorded.

In 2007, a study reported a case of a pair of living twins, which shared an identical set of maternal chromosomes, while each having a distinct set of paternal chromosomes, albeit from the same man, and thus they most likely share half of their father's genetic makeup. The twins were both found to be chimeras. One was an intersex XX, and one a XY male. The exact mechanism of fertilization could not be determined but the study stated that it was unlikely to be a case of polar body twinning.

The likely genetic basis of semi-identical twins was reported in 2019 by Michael Gabbett and Nicholas Fisk. In their seminal publication, Gabbett, Fisk and colleagues documented a second case of sesquizygosis and presented molecular evidence of the phenomenon. The reported twins shared 100% of their maternal chromosomes and 78% of their paternal genomic information. The authors presented evidence that two sperm from the same man fertilized an ovum simultaneously. The chromosomes assorted themselves through heterogonesis to form three cell lines. The purely paternal cell line died out due to genomic imprinting lethality, while the other two cell lines, each consisting of the same maternal DNA but only 50% identical paternal DNA, formed a morula which subsequently split into twins.

Mirror image twins
Mirror image twins result when a fertilized egg splits later in the embryonic stage than normal timing, around day 9–12. This type of twinning could exhibit characteristics with reversed asymmetry, such as opposite dominant handedness, dental structure, or even organs (situs inversus). If the split occurs later than this time period, the twins risk being conjoined. There is no DNA-based zygosity test that can determine if twins are indeed mirror image. The term "mirror image" is used because the twins, when facing each other, appear as matching reflections.

Language development
There have been many studies highlighting the development of language in twins compared to single-born children. These studies have converged on the notion that there is a greater rate of delay in language development in twins compared to their single-born counterparts.  The reasons for this phenomenon are still in question; however, cryptophasia was thought to be the major cause.  Idioglossia is defined as a private language that is usually invented by young children, specifically twins. Another term to describe what some people call "twin talk" is cryptophasia where a language is developed by twins that only they can understand.  The increased focused communication between two twins may isolate them from the social environment surrounding them.  Idioglossia has been found to be a rare occurrence and the attention of scientists has shifted away from this idea.  However, there are researchers and scientists that say cryptophasia or idioglossia is not a rare phenomenon. Current research is looking into the impacts of a richer social environment for these twins to stimulate their development of language.

Animals
Twins are common in many mammal species, including cats, sheep, ferrets, giant pandas, cows, dolphins, dogs, deer, marmosets, tamarins, and elephants. The incidence of twinning among cattle is about 1–4%, and research is underway to improve the odds of twinning, which can be more profitable for the breeder if complications can be sidestepped or managed. A female calf that is the twin of a bull becomes partially masculinized and is known as a freemartin.

See also

 Cloning
 Doppelgänger
 Evil twin
 Gemini (astrology)
 List of multiple births
 List of notable twins
 Litter (animal)
 Look-alike
 Mixed twins
 Multiple birth
 Multiverse
 Superfecundation
 Twin study
 Twin towns and sister cities
 Twins in mythology
 Virtual twin

References

Further reading
Bacon, Kate. Twins in Society: Parents, Bodies, Space, and Talk (Palgrave Macmillan; 2010) 221 pages; explores the experience of child twins, adult twins, and parents of twins, with a focus on Britain.
 
 
 
 
 
 
 
 
 
 
 Am J Med Genet C Semin Med Genet. 2009 May 15;151C(2):136-41. Not really identical: epigenetic differences in monozygotic twins and implications for twin studies in psychiatry. Haque FN, Gottesman II, Wong AH.
Twin brothers promoted as Majors General together. Seneviratne brothers, who are twins and joined the Army on a same day, were promoted to the rank of Major General, again on the same day.
Guinness World Record holding twins: https://www.guinnessworldrecords.com/news/2022/11/theyre-so-different-even-though-theyre-identical-twins-725135

External links 
 Twins - news and articles 

 
Reproduction in mammals
Sibling
Zoology